Iamblichus was a Syrian neoplatonic philosopher of Arabic origin. He determined a direction later taken by neoplatonism. Iamblichus was also the biographer of the Greek mystic, philosopher, and mathematician Pythagoras. In addition to his philosophical contributions, his  is important for the study of the sophists because it preserved about ten pages of an otherwise-unknown sophist known as the Anonymus Iamblichi.

Life 
The son of a wealthy, well-known family, Iamblichus was descended from the Emesene dynasty. He initially studied under Anatolius of Laodicea and later studied under Porphyry, a pupil of Plotinus (the founder of neoplatonism).

He returned to Coele Syria around 304 to found a school in Apamea (near Antioch), a city known for its neoplatonic philosophers. Iamblichus designed a curriculum for studying Plato and Aristotle, and wrote commentaries on the two which survive only in fragments. Pythagoras was his supreme authority, and he wrote the ten-volume Collection of Pythagorean Doctrines with extracts from several ancient philosophers; only the first four volumes and fragments of the fifth survive.

Iamblichus wrote the Exhortation to Philosophy in Apamea during the early fourth century. Considered a man of great culture and learning, he was renowned for his charity and self-denial and had a number of students. According to Fabricius, he died sometime before 333 during the reign of Constantine.

Philosophy 
Iamblichus detailed Plotinus' neoplatonic formal divisions, applied Pythagorean number symbolism more systematically, and (influenced by Oriental systems) interpreted neoplatonic concepts mythically. Unlike Plotinus, who broke from platonic tradition by positing a separate soul, Iamblichus re-affirmed the soul's embodiment in matter and believed that matter was as divine as the rest of the cosmos.

Cosmology and theology 

Iamblichus placed the Monad at the head of his system, from which emanates the Nous (intellect, or demiurge) and the psyche. Plotinus represented the Nous as three stages: objective being, subjective life, and realized intellect. Iamblichus divided them into two spheres: intelligible (the objects of thought) and intellective (the domain of thought).

Iamblichus and Proclus may have introduced a third sphere between the two worlds, separating and uniting them. The identification of nous with the demiurge in the neoplatonic tradition was adopted and developed in Christian gnosticism. St. Augustine follows Plotinus, identifying the nous with logos (the creative principle) as part of the Trinity.

Iamblichus multiplied the number of divine entities according to universal mathematical theorems. He conceived of gods, angels, demons and heroes: twelve heavenly gods (whose number increases to 36 or 360), 72 other gods proceeding from them, 21 chiefs and 42 nature-gods. His divine realm extends from the Monad to material nature, where the soul descends into matter and becomes embodied in human form. These superhuman beings influence natural events and communicate knowledge about the future, and are accessible with prayers and offerings. Iamblichus posited that numbers are independent, occupying a middle realm between the limited and unlimited.  He believed that nature was bound by fate, differing from divine things which are not subject to fate and turn evil and imperfection to good ends; evil was generated accidentally in the conflict between the finite and the infinite.

Works 
Only a fraction of Iamblichus' books have survived; knowledge of his system is preserved in fragments of writings preserved by Stobaeus and others: notes by his successors (especially Proclus), his five extant books and sections of his work on Pythagoreanism. In addition to these, Proclus attributed to him the Theurgia (also known as The Egyptian Mysteries). Although stylistic and doctrinal differences exist between this book and Iamblichus' other works, it originated from his school at least.

Editions and translations 
 On the Mysteries, ed. Gustav Parthey, Teubner, 1857; ed. Edouard des  Places, Collection Budé, 1989.
 English translations: Thomas Taylor, 1821,; Alexander Wilder, 1911; Emma C. Clarke, John M. Dillon, and Jackson P. Hershbell, 2003, .
 The Life of Pythagoras 
 On the Pythagorean Way of Life, ed. Theophil Kießling, Leipzig, 1816; ed. August Nauck, St. Petersburg, 1884; ed. Ludwig Deubner, Teubner, 1937 (rev. Ulrich Klein, 1975).
 English translations: Gillian Clark, 1989, ; John M. Dillon and Jackson Hershbell, 1991, 
 On General Mathematical Science, ed. Nicola Festa, Teubner, 1891 (reprint 1975) 
 Protrepticus, ed. Ermenegildo Pistelli, Teubner, 1888 (repr. 1975); ed. des Places, Budé, 1989.
 English translation: Thomas Moore Johnson, Iamblichus' exhortation to the study of philosophy, Osceola, Mo., 1907 (repr. 1988).
 In Nicomachi arithmeticam introductionem, Teubner, ed. Pistelli, Teubner, 1894 (rev. Klein, 1975)
 Letters: John M. Dillon and Wolfgang Polleichtner, Iamblichus of Chalcis: The Letters, 2009, .
 Fragmentary commentaries on Plato and Aristotle
 Bent Dalsgaard Larsen,  (vol. 2, appendix: Testimonia et fragmenta exegetica), Universitetsforlaget i Aarhus, 1972 (Greek texts only).
 John M. Dillon (ed. and trans.), Leiden: Brill, 1973.
 John F. Finamore and John M. Dillon, Iamblichus' De Anima: Text, Translation, and Commentary, Leiden: Brill, 2002, .
 Theological principles of arithmetic (Theologumena arithmeticae, an anonymous work ascribed to Iamblichus or Anatolius of Laodicea), ed. Friedrich Ast, Leipzig, 1817; ed. Vittorio de Falco, Teubner, 1922.
 English translation: Robin Waterfield, Pseudo-Iamblichus: The Theology of Arithmetic, translation, introduction, notes; foreword by K. Critchlow, Phanes Press, 1988, .

Reception 
Iamblichus was praised by his followers, and contemporaries credited him with miraculous powers. The Roman emperor Julian, not content with Eunapius' modest eulogy that Iamblichus was inferior to Porphyry only in style, regarded him as second only to Plato and said that he would give all the gold in Lydia for one of his letters. During the 15th- and 16th-century revival of interest in his philosophy, Iamblichus' name was rarely mentioned without the epithet "divine" or "most divine".

See also 
 Henotheism

References

Bibliography 

 
  (has an excellent section on Iamblichus' and the Neoplatonists' relation to the works attributed to Hermes Trismegistus)

Attribution

External links 
 
 

3rd-century Romans
4th-century Romans
3rd-century philosophers
4th-century philosophers
3rd-century writers
4th-century writers
240s births
320s deaths
Year of birth uncertain
Year of death uncertain
Pagan anti-Gnosticism
Occult writers
Neoplatonists
Neo-Pythagoreans
Ancient Roman philosophers
Syrian philosophers
Emesene dynasty
Apamea, Syria
Arabs in the Roman Empire
3rd-century Arabs
4th-century Arabs
3rd-century mathematicians
4th-century mathematicians